Petra Cetkovská was the defending champion, but lost in the all-Czech final to the top seed Barbora Krejčíková, 3–6, 6–4, 7–6(7–5).

Seeds

Main draw

Finals

Top half

Bottom half

References 
 Main draw

Its Cup - Singles
ITS Cup